The Keep Aways is an American punk band from Duluth, Minnesota.  Since releasing their début album in 2004, the band has toured the U.S. with Black Eyed Snakes and Low.  The Keep Aways music has been compared to Babes in Toyland and The Gossip by the College Music Journal.

Lead singer Mindy Johnson has also been a member of The Little Black Books and currently also plays with the doom metal band WOLF BLOOD. Bassist Nikki Moeller has also been a member of the band Boy Girl Boy Girl & currently also plays with Dad's Acid. Drummer Chris C. Dubz has been part of numerous bands including the Acceleratti, Some Peoples Kids and is currently the drummer for Minneapolis rockers Squares.  He is known to often 'take his shirt off' when requested.

The Keep Aways have performed at the CMJ Music Festival, Warped Tour, Homegrown Music Festival, as well as the North VS. South festival in Duluth, Minnesota and the North vs. South Music Festival.

In 2004 and 2006, the Keep Aways were nominated for "Best Punk Band" by the Minnesota Music Awards. In 2006, the Keep Aways lost to  The Plastic Constellations.

The Keep Aways importance stems from their post-riot grrrl music and notably being one of the most straight up, real bands out of Duluth, Minnesota among peers and national acts Low, Black Eyed Snakes, Haley Bonar, Charlie Parr, and If Thousands not to mention Minnesota itself.

Lineup
 Mindy Johnson-- guitar, vocals
 Nikki Moeller-- bass, vocals
 Chris C Dubz-- drums, vocals

Discography

Studio albums
 The Keep Aways - (Chairkickers' Union Music, 2005)limited edition hand stamped canvas sleeve No. 1500/2nd pressing- screen print No. 500
 Decay - (TKA Records, 2008)
 "TBA" (2014)

EPs
 ...get held back - (Shaky Ray Records, 2002) 3-track cd No. 100
 the keep aways/the dt's- split 7-inch (TKA Records, 2007) limited edition red vinyl No. 500

Singles
 "Hillside, Excess, and Rivalry" (split single with The DTs) - (Self-Released, 2007)

Compilations
 Chilly Northern Women - (Spinout Records, 2002)
 Superior Street Rocks - (Sup Records, 2002)
 420 Massacre- Live at the Capri - (Sup Records, 2003)
 Homegrown Rawk and/or Roll: Lindquist's Mix - (Homegrown Music Festival, 2009)
 ARMC Presents...the Twin Ports- (ARMC, 2010)
 "One week live..." (Beaners 2011)

References
Cited

More references
 Chen, Steven. "Screech Blanket Bingo" CMJ New Music Monthly vol. 133, 2005.
 Cummins, Johnson. "Seventeen Minutes of Vitriolic, Meat and Potatoes Punk Rock." Montreal Mirror, Vol. 20. No. 46. May 12, 2005.
 Earplug Radio. "Aggressiveness With the Patchouli."  October 2006. http://www.earplugradio.com/epk.php?band_id=41
 Gintowt, Richard. "The Sixth-Annual North vs. South Music Festival Brings Middle America’s Best Indie-Rock Heroes to Kansas City." The Pitch. August 18, 2009.
 Klar, Scott. "The Keep Aways at Home Grown." Home Grown Festival. http://www.duluthhomegrown.com/bands/keepaways/keepaways.html 2009.
 Newgard, Jenny. The Keep Aways Issue 15, Rift Magazine, 2007.
 Riemenschneider, Chris. "The Minnesota Music Awards generated chatter this year - some of it for the right reasons" Star Tribune, October 6, 2006.
 Schmitt, Christina. Keeping It in Duluth - Post-Riot Grrls the Keep Aways Will Always Come Home Star Tribune, 2006.
 Scholtes, Peter S. "Hey, We're In Duluth." City Pages. February 7, 2001.

External links
 Official Website
 Myspace Profile

Punk rock groups from Minnesota
Musical groups established in 2001